Sharon Tomiko Santos (née Miyake, born July 5, 1961) is an American politician serving as a member of the Washington House of Representatives for the 37th legislative district.

Early life and education 
Santos was born in San Francisco, California. Santos earned a bachelor's degree from Evergreen State College and earned a master's degree from Northeastern University.

Career 
Santos was first elected to the Washington House of Representatives in 1998. She serves on the Education; Finance; Insurance, Financial Services & Consumer Protection; and Rules committees.

Personal life 
Santos lives in the Rainier Beach neighborhood of Seattle. She was married to activist Bob Santos until his death in 2016.

References

External links 
 Official Biography
 Contact Information

1961 births
Living people
American politicians of Japanese descent
Democratic Party members of the Washington House of Representatives
Northeastern University alumni
Evergreen State College alumni
Women state legislators in Washington (state)
Asian-American people in Washington (state) politics
American women of Japanese descent in politics
21st-century American politicians
21st-century American women politicians
Politicians from San Francisco
20th-century American politicians
20th-century American women politicians